Byfield is a rural locality in the Shire of Livingstone, Queensland, Australia.

Geography 
It is within the local government area of Shire of Livingstone (between 2008 and 2013, it was within the Rockhampton Region).

Waterpark Creek forms much of the north-eastern boundary. Sandy Creek, a tributary of Waterpark, also forms part of that boundary.

History 
The locality's name is thought to be a corruption of Fifefield, a name shown on a 1859 sketch by pastoralist Colin Archer.

Byfield State School opened its doors on 12 November 1923.

Heritage listings
Byfield has a number of heritage-listed sites, including:
 2312 Byfield Road: Raspberry Creek Homestead
 between Byfield Road and Richters Road: Old Byfield Road

Amenities 
The Livingstone Shire Council operate a public library at the Raspberry Creek Homestead at 2312 Byfield Road.

There is a general store in Byfield which caters for light meals as well as fuel and grocery items. Byfield has retreat style cabins and camping, offering accommodation in a rainforest setting with natural creeks and waterholes.

Education 
Byfield State School is a government primary (Prep-6) school for boys and girls at 2233 Byfield Road. In 2017, the school had an enrolment of 33 students with 3 teachers (2 full-time equivalent) and 5 non-teaching staff (2 full-time equivalent).

There is no secondary school in Byfield; the nearest is Yeppoon State High School.

References

External links

 
Towns in Queensland
Shire of Livingstone
Localities in Queensland